Deschwanden or von Deschwanden is a surname. Notable people with the surname include: 

Gregor Deschwanden (born 1991), Swiss ski jumper
Lucas von Deschwanden (born 1989), Swiss handball player
Melchior Paul von Deschwanden (1811–1881), Swiss painter